Angaaraka is a 2014 Indian action drama film directed by Srinivas Kaushik and produced by Jayasudha Raghavendra. The film stars Prajwal Devaraj, Pranitha Subhash and Hardhika Shetty in the lead roles. The film released on 10 January 2014 to the mixed and negative reviews.

Plot
A village politician's (Avinash) son Vijay (Prajwal) comes back to his village after his graduation. He intends to settle down in his village and meets Priya (Pranitha), a girl from an ordinary villager. But his father wants him to marry Kavya (Hardhika), who is from an affluent family, which in turn would benefit his political ambitions. Vijay makes his stand firm and proceeds to marry off Priya. Meanwhile, his father hatches a plot by playing an astrological gimmick and makes Vijay believe that the things would go awry after the marriage. How the couple reunite and goes against the wishes of elders forms the rest of the plot.

Cast
 Prajwal Devaraj as Viji a.k.a. Vijay
 Pranitha Subhash as Priya
 Hardhika Shetty as Kavya
 Avinash as Viji's father
 Jai Jagadish as Rajashekar
 Muni
 Dharma
 Chidanand
 Shivaram
 Veena Sundar
 Veena Venkatesh
 Kishore
 Vikram

Release

Critical reception
The film opened to mostly average and negative reviews from the critics. The Times of India rated 3/5 stars while stating that "the movie is a waste of effort as it is done without any imagination" while panning the director's job. The Indian cine gallery gave a verdict as a "very ordinary presentation" again criticizing the work of the director.

Soundtrack 
The music is composed by Arjun Janya for Ashwini Media company and lyrics are written by Ghouse Peer, Gee Gee and Shyam Shimoga. The audio release of the film was held on 1 November 2013 coinciding the Kannada Rajyotsava day. A total of 5 tracks have been composed by Arjun Janya.

References

External links
 Movie discussion

2014 films
2010s Kannada-language films
Indian action drama films
2014 action drama films
Films scored by Arjun Janya